The president of La Rioja is the head of government of the Spanish autonomous community of La Rioja. The current incumbent is Concha Andreu of the PSOE, who has held the office since 29 August 2019.

List of presidents (1982 - present)

References

 
La Rioja (Spain)